

Athysanini is a tribe of leafhoppers in the subfamily Deltocephalinae. The type genus of the tribe is Athysanus. The tribe has a cosmopolitan distribution. It is the largest tribe in the subfamily Deltocephalinae and has 228 genera and at least 1120 species.

Genera
Genera within this tribe include:

 Afrovarta 
 Amblytelinus Lindberg, 1954 
 Anoplotettix Ribaut, 1942 
 Artianus Ribaut, 1942 
 Athysanus Burmeister, 1838
 Biluscelis Dlabola, 1980 
 Bilusius Ribaut, 1942 
 Bobacella Kusnezov, 1929 
 Brachypterona Lindberg, 1954 
 Colladonus Ball, 1936 
 Colobotettix Ribaut, 1948 
 Condylotes Emeljanov, 1959 
 Conosanus Osborn & Ball, 1902 
 Coulinus Beirne, 1954 
 Doliotettix Ribaut, 1942 
 Dudanus Dlabola, 1956 
 Ederranus Ribaut, 1942 
 Elymana De Long, 1936 
 Eohardya Zachvatkin, 1946 
 Euscelidius Ribaut, 1942 
 Euscelis Brullé, 1832 
 Graphocraerus Thomson, 1869 
 Handianus Ribaut, 1942 
 Hardya Edwards, 1822 
 Hesium Ribaut, 1942 
 Idiodonus Ball, 1936 
 Laburrus Ribaut, 1942 
 Limotettix J. Sahlberg, 1871 
 Macustus Ribaut, 1942 
 Melillaia Linnavuori, 1971 
 Mimallygus Ribaut, 1948 
 Miraldus Lindberg, 1960 
 Mocydia Edwards, 1922 
 Napo Linnavuori & DeLong, 1976
 Mocydiopsis Ribaut, 1939 
 Neoreticulum Dai, 2009 
 Neurotettix Matsumura, 1914
 Ophiola Edwards, 1922 
 Orientus DeLong, 1938 
 Osbornellus Ball, 1932 
 Oxytettigella Metcalf, 1952 
 Paluda DeLong, 1937 
 Paramesodes Ishihara, 1953 
 Perotettix Ribaut, 1942 
 Phycotettix Haupt, 1929 
 Pithyotettix Ribaut, 1942 
 Proceps Mulsant & Rey, 1855 
 Rhopalopyx Ribaut, 1939 
 Rhytistylus Fieber, 1875 
 Sardius Ribaut, 1946 
 Scaphoideus Uhler, 1889 
 Selachina Emeljanov, 1962 
 Selenocephalus Germar, 1833 
 Sotanus Ribaut, 1942 
 Speudotettix Ribaut, 1942 
 Stenometopiellus Haupt, 1917 
 Stictocoris Thomson, 1869 
 Streptanus Ribaut, 1942 
 Streptopyx Linnavuori, 1958 
 Taurotettix Haupt, 1929

References 

 
Deltocephalinae
Hemiptera tribes